FC Grün-Weiß Piesteritz is a German football club based in Wittenberg, Saxony-Anhalt, currently playing in the Verbandsliga Sachsen-Anhalt (VI).

History 
The earliest forerunner of FC Grün-Weiß Piesteritz was founded on 1 April 1919 as 1. FC Wacker Piesteritz, which became VfR Piesteritz in 1924 and TSB Piesteritz in 1933. After World War II, the club was renamed BSG Chemie Piesteritz which became SV Grün-Weiß Wittenberg-Piesteritz upon German reunification. In 2001, the footballing department of the sports club broke away to become FC Grün-Weiß Piesteritz and they currently play in the sixth tier Verbandsliga Sachsen-Anhalt (VI), having been relegated from the 2013–14 NOFV-Oberliga Süd after three seasons at this level.

Summary of previous names 
 1919–1924 1. FC Wacker Piesteritz
 1924–1933 VfR Piesteritz
 1933–1946 TSB Piesteritz
 1949–1990 BSG Chemie Piesteritz
 1990–2001 SV Grün-Weiß Wittenberg-Piesteritz
 since 2001 FC Grün-Weiß Piesteritz

Honours 
The club's honours:
 Verbandsliga Sachsen-Anhalt
 Champions: 2011
 Runners-up: 2009

Stadium 
FC Grün-Weiß Piesteritz plays its home fixtures at the 4,000 capacity Volksparkstadion.

References

External links 
 FC Grün-Weiß Piesteritz 

Football clubs in Germany
Football clubs in Saxony-Anhalt
Association football clubs established in 2001
Wittenberg
2001 establishments in Germany